Mümtaz'er Türköne, (born 1956 in Istanbul), is a Turkish academic and author. He was a faculty member at Gazi University from 1993 to 2007 and was a columnist for the Zaman and its English-language sister Today's Zaman.

In the 1990s Türköne was a member of the Analitik Grubu group of advisors to Prime Minister Tansu Çiller.

In January 2012 Türköne resigned from the Atatürk Culture, Language and History Institution, a month after being appointed by President Abdullah Gül. His appointment had been criticised as Türköne had previously described Atatürkism as a "closed minded and bigoted" ideology. 

He is the ex-husband of former AKP deputy Özlem Türköne.

Awards
 Türkiye Yazarlar Birliği 2006, "Media/thought" category

Books 
 Siyasi İdeoloji Olarak İslamcılığın Doğuşu
 Cemaleddin Afgani (on Jamal ad-Din al-Afghani)
 Siyaset
 Darbe Peşinde Koşan Bir Nesil 68 Kuşağı
 Sözde Askerler
 Türkiye'nin Kayıp Halkası
 Türklük ve Kürtlük
 Türk Modernleşmesi
 Modernleşme, Laiklik
 Siyasi, Tarihi, Dini ve Kültürel Boyutlarıyla İslam ve Şiddet
 Türkler ve İslamiyet (with İlber Ortaylı and Nevzat Yalçıntaş.)
 Kürt Meselesi Nasıl Çözülmez? (with Hüseyin Yayman)

 References 

External links
 www.mumtazerturkone.com
 Taraf'', 13 October 2008, Mümtazer Türköne: ‘Askeri devlet kurmak istiyorlar’ (interview)

1956 births
Living people
Academics from Istanbul
Ankara University Faculty of Political Sciences alumni
Zaman (newspaper) people
Academic staff of Gazi University